The Mazda K-series automobile engine is a short stroke 60° 24-valve V6 with belt-driven DOHC and all-aluminium construction. Displacements range from 1.8 L to 2.5 L. They all use a 27-degree DOHC valvetrain with directly actuated hydraulic bucket lifters. The K-series also features a highly rigid aluminum split-crankcase engine block design with 4-bolt mains with additional bolts securing the lower block, an internally balanced forged steel crankshaft with lightweight powder forged carbon steel connecting rods. They were designed with the intent of being as compact as possible for short-hood front-wheel drive applications.

One unique innovation of the K-series was the introduction of Variable Resonance Induction System (VRIS). Based on the Helmholtz resonance principle, the intake manifold is equipped with 3 chambers tuned to a specific resonant frequency. The computer dynamically switches between each resonant chamber to achieve the appropriate resonant frequency for the engine's rpm. This effect optimizes volumetric efficiency over a given rpm range to provide maximum torque over the entire rpm range. VRIS is used on the K8, KF, and KL but nearly all modern Mazda V6s are now using this technology.

The K-series all have a 7,000 rpm redline with 7500-7800 rpm limiter, which given the engine design is conservative. The KJ-ZEM Miller cycle engine had a 6,000 rpm redline, but was only available with an automatic transmission.

K8

The  K8 is among the smallest production V6 engines ever; and also the first K-series engine to be used in a Mazda car (in the Mazda MX-3). The displacement was held under 2000cc to minimize the annual Japanese road tax obligation.

Applications:
 Mazda MX-3
 Eunos 500

KF

 2.0 L KF -   bore and stroke - The 2.0 L KF engine was available in various states of tune.

 1991-1997 Mazda MX-6
 1992-1993 Eunos 500,  
 1993-2002 Eunos 800
 1992-1998 Efini MS-8
 1993-1999 Xedos 6
 1993-2002 Xedos 9
 1993-1996 Mazda Lantis Type R  170 hp (124 kW; 172 PS) 190 N•m (140 lb•ft)
 1994-1996 Mazda 323f V6 GLX
 1996-1998 Mazda 323f ZXi
 1992-1995 Ford Telstar TX5 Ghia
 1993-2003 Mazda 626 LX

KJ-ZEM

The   bore and stroke,  KJ-ZEM was one of Mazda's most technologically advanced engines. It employs the "Miller cycle" which uses a supercharger to increase compression efficiency by decreasing the compression losses (i.e., flywheel energy used to compress the intake charge in the cylinder); and thereby increasing the net power output of the V6. It was used in the T-platform cars. The supercharger used is the twin-screw type with electronic boost control. The KJ-ZEM was on the Ward's 10 Best Engines list for 1995 through 1998.

Applications:
 Mazda Millenia S
 Eunos 800
 Mazda Xedos 9

KL

The  KL family uses an  bore and stroke. In 1998 a revised version of the KL known as the KL-G4 was used in the 626. It featured solid lifters, a cast crankshaft to reduce rotating mass and a reworked intake system. The distributor was replaced with a Ford EDIS coil-pack ignition.

Mazda introduced a key technology with these engines, known as the Variable Resonance Induction System (VRIS). A series of two butterfly valves coupled with electronically controlled actuators varied the volume and length of a resonant chamber within the intake manifold. The valves actuate at particular engine frequencies (i.e. rpms) to produce optimal torque/horsepower output at any given engine speed. The valve operates to create three specific first-order resonant frequencies that increase cylinder air charge. All three resonances are used from 0 to 6250 rpm (6800 for the KL-ZE). Above that threshold, the first primary resonant chamber is again used, but at this engine speed the pressure wave from the second-order resonant frequency aids in charging the cylinder.

 KL-DE
 1993-1997 Mazda MX-6 LS (A spec)
 1993-1997 Ford Probe GT
 1992-1995 Ford Telstar TX5 Ghia, TX5 Ghia 4ws
 1993-1997 Mazda 626 ES, LX (after 1994)
 1995-2002 Mazda Millenia L
 KL-ZE
 1997 Mazda Capella Wagon
 1993+ Mazda 626 Jspec Sedan
 1993+ Mazda MX-6 Jspec
 1993+ Mazda MS-8 (Japan)
 1993+ Mazda Eunos 600/800 (Japan)
 KL-G4
 1998-2002 Mazda 626 ES, LX

External links

 Mazda New Lightweight and Compact V6 Engines SAE article 920677  

K
V6 engines
Gasoline engines by model